The Yugoslav Chess Championship was an annual chess tournament held to determine the Yugoslav national champion and Yugoslavia's candidates for the World Chess Championship.

It was first played in 1935 in Belgrade, the capital of Kingdom of Yugoslavia and ended with its 46th iteration after the breakup of SFR Yugoslavia.

Winners list (men)

Kingdom of Yugoslavia 

{| class="sortable wikitable"
! No. !! Year !! Location !! Champion
|-
|  1 || 1935 || Belgrade ||Vasja Pirc and Borislav Kostić
|-
|  2 || 1936 || Novi Sad ||Vasja Pirc
|-
|  3 || 1937 || Rogaška Slatina ||Vasja Pirc, Mieczysław Najdorf off contest
|-
|  4 || 1938 || Ljubljana ||Borislav Kostić 
|-
|  5 || 1939 || Zagreb ||Milan Vidmar
|}

SFR Yugoslavia 

{| class="sortable wikitable"
! No. !! Year !! Champion
|-
|  1 || 1945 || Petar Trifunović
|-
|  2 || 1946 || Petar Trifunović
|-
|  3 || 1947 || Petar Trifunović
|-
|  4 || 1948 || Svetozar Gligorić  Vasja Pirc
|-
|  5 || 1949 || Svetozar Gligorić
|-
|  6 || 1950 || Svetozar Gligorić
|-
|  7 || 1951 || Braslav Rabar
|-
|  8 || 1952 || Petar Trifunović
|-
|  9 || 1953 || Vasja Pirc
|-
|  10 || 1955 || Nikola Karaklaji%C4%87
|-
| 11 || 1956 || Svetozar Gligorić
|-
| 12 || 1957 || Svetozar Gligorić
|-
| 13 || 1958 || Svetozar Gligorić  Borislav Ivkov
|-
| 14 || 1959 || Svetozar Gligorić
|-
| 15 || 1960 || Svetozar Gligorić
|-
| 16 || 1961 || Petar Trifunović
|-
| 17 || 1962 || Aleksandar Matanović  Dragoljub Minić
|-
| 18 || 1962 || Svetozar Gligorić
|-
| 19 || 1963 || Borislav Ivkov  Mijo Udovčić
|-
| 20 || 1965 || Milan Matulović
|-
| 21 || 1965 || Svetozar Gligorić
|-
| 22 || 1967 || Milan Matulović
|-
| 23 || 1968 || Predrag Ostojić  Janez Stupica
|-
| 24 || 1969 || Aleksandar Matanović
|-
| 25 || 1970 || Dragoljub Velimirović  Milan Vukić
|-
| 26 || 1971 || Predrag Ostojić  Milan Vukić
|-
| 27 || 1972 || Borislav Ivkov
|-
| 28 || 1973 || Božidar Ivanović
|-
| 29 || 1974 || Milan Vukić
|-
| 30 || 1975 || Dragoljub Velimirović
|-
| 31 || 1976 || Krunoslav Hulak
|-
| 32 || 1977 || Ljubomir Ljubojević  Srđan Marangunić
|-
| 33 || 1978 || Aleksandar Matanović
|-
| 34 || 1979 || Ivan Nemet
|-
| 35 || 1980 || Predrag Nikolić
|-
| 36 || 1981 || Božidar Ivanović
|-
| 37 || 1982 || Ljubomir Ljubojević
|-
| 38 || 1983 || Božidar Ivanović  Dušan Rajković
|-
| 39 || 1984 || Predrag Nikolić
|-
| 40 || 1985 || Slavoljub Marjanović
|-
| 41 || 1986 || Dragan Barlov
|-
| 42 || 1987 || Miralem Dževlan
|-
| 43 || 1988 || Ivan Sokolov
|-
| 44 || 1989 || Zdenko Kožul
|-
| 45 || 1990 || Zdenko Kožul
|-
| 46 || 1991 || Branko Damljanović
|}

Winners list (women)

SFR Yugoslavia 

{| class="sortable wikitable"
! No. !! Year !! Champion
|-
| 1 || 1947 || Lidija Timofejeva
|-
| 2 || 1948 || Lidija Timofejeva
|-
| 3 || 1949 || Lidija Timofejeva  Slava Cvenkl
|-
| 4 || 1950 || Vera Nedeljković
|-
| 5 || 1951 || Vera Nedeljković
|-
| 6 || 1952 || Vera Nedeljković  Milunka Lazarević
|-
| 7 || 1953 || Vera Nedeljković
|-
| 8 || 1954 || Milunka Lazarević
|-
| 9 || 1955 || Nagy-Radenković
|-
| 10 || 1956 || Milunka Lazarević
|-
| 11 || 1957 || Milunka Lazarević
|-
| 12 || 1958 || Vera Nedeljković
|-
| 13 || 1959 || Ljubica Jocić
|-
| 14 || 1960 || Milunka Lazarević
|-
| 15 || 1961 || Katarina Jovanović-Blagojević
|-
| 16 || 1962 || Milunka Lazarević
|-
| 17 || 1963 || Milunka Lazarević
|-
| 18 || 1964 || Tereza Štadler
|-
| 19 || 1965 || Vera Nedeljković 
|-
| 20 || 1967 || Henrijeta Konarkowska-Sokolov
|-
| 21 || 1968 || Henrijeta Konarkowska-Sokolov
|-
| 22 || 1969 || Ružica Jovanović
|-
| 23 || 1970 || 
|-
| 24 || 1971 || Henrijeta Konarkowska-Sokolov
|-
| 25 || 1972 || Katarina Jovanović-Blagojević
|-
| 26 || 1973 || Amalija Pihajlić
|-
| 27 || 1974 || Katarina Jovanović-Blagojević
|-
| 28 || 1975 || Milunka Lazarević
|-
| 29 || 1976 || Milunka Lazarević
|-
| 30 || 1977 || Amalija Pihajlić  Gordana Marković
|-
| 31 || 1978 || Olivera Prokopović
|-
| 32 || 1979 || Milunka Lazarević
|-
| 33 || 1980 || Vlasta Maček
|-
| 34 || 1981 || Gordana Marković
|-
| 35 || 1982 || Milunka Lazarević
|-
| 36 || 1983 || Marija Petrović  Suzana Maksimović
|-
| 37 || 1984 || Marija Petrović
|-
| 38 || 1985 || Zorica Nikolin
|-
| 39 || 1986 || Alisa Marić
|-
| 40 || 1987 || Zorica Nikolin
|-
| 41 || 1988 || Vesna Bašagić
|-
| 42 || 1989 || Daniela Nutu-Gajić
|-
| 43 || 1990 || Jordanka Mićić
|-
| 44 || 1991 || Mirjana Marić  Suzana Maksimović
|}

Notes

References
 (men's results from 1945 through 1976)
https://web.archive.org/web/20070208092339/http://www.rogerpaige.me.uk/
https://web.archive.org/web/20070806233356/http://sah.vrsac.com/Aktuelno/Koviljaca.asp
http://xoomer.alice.it/cserica/scacchi/storiascacchi/tornei/pagine/yugoslavia.htm

Results from TWIC: 2000, 2005, 2005, 2007, 2007, 2008

Women's chess national championships